This is the discography of Jedi Mind Tricks.

Albums

Compilations

EPs/Singles

Jus Allah discography

References

Hip hop discographies